The Rolex Yacht-Master II is a sport watch made by Rolex, unveiled in 2007 and first introduced in March 2010 with the models 116688 (Yellow Gold) and 116689 (White Gold). One year later, in 2011, Rolex introduced the model 116681 which was made from steel and everose gold. At Baselworld 2013, the watch was available for the first time in 904L steel, the model 116680, fitted with a Cerachrom bezel insert in blue ceramic. Originally, the Yacht-Master II used Rolex's 4160 movement but with the introduction of the model 116680 in 2013, the movement was updated to the 4161 movement specifically designed for the Yacht-Master II. All Yacht-Master II watches have a case size of 44mm.

4161 Movement 
The Rolex 4161 movement is a chronograph movement with the complication of a programmable timer that counts down ten minutes. The countdown mechanism was primarily designed for regattas where the Starting sequence can last up to ten minutes. The movement took 35,000 hours (nearly four years) to create and is made up from 360 parts. The movement also has a 72-hour power reserve for when the watch is inactive.

The countdown mechanism is constructed using a column wheel that extends through the main plate and a vertical clutch. The mechanism makes it possible for the wearer to program in advance of the official countdown time and then start the timer once the countdown has begun, and the mechanism can be programmed to count down 0 to 10 minutes.  The countdown feature can be locked and unlocked by twisting the bezel through 90 degrees. The Yacht-Master II was one of the first watches in the world to have a bezel that worked in conjunction with the movement.

If the wearer has started the countdown either too early or too late, then the countdown can be synchronized. By pressing the start/stop button, located at the 2 o'clock position, and then pressing the reset button, located at the 4 o'clock position, the minute countdown hand repositions itself to the nearest minute while the seconds countdown hand returns to 0.

Design 
All Yacht-Master II models, regardless of metal variants, have a case diameter of 44mm. The bezel has a blue Cerachrom insert apart from on the model 116689 which is exclusively platinum. All Yacht-Masters have a screwdown, Triplock crown and a sapphire crystal designed to be scratch-resistant.

The bracelet on all models is an Oyster design with three-element links. The centre link is either polished or gold depending on the model. The clasp has a 5mm extension link built in.

References 

Rolex watches
Products introduced in 2010